This is a list of cities and towns in Romania, ordered by population (largest to smallest) according to the 2002, 2011 and 2021 censuses. For the major cities, average elevation is also given. Cities in bold are county capitals. The list includes major cities with the status of municipiu (103 in total), as well as towns with the status of oraș (217 in total).

Romania has 1 city with more than 1 million residents (Bucharest with 1,883,425 people), 19 cities with more than 100,000 residents, and 178 towns with more than 10,000 residents.

Complete list

See also
List of cities in Europe
List of city listings by country

References

Cities in Romania
Towns in Romania
Romania 2
Romania
Romania
Cities